NGC 512, also occasionally referred to as PGC 5132 or UGC 944, is a spiral galaxy in the constellation Andromeda. It is located approximately 217 million light-years from the Solar System and was discovered on 17 November 1827 by astronomer John Herschel.

Observation history 
Herschel's discovery is based on a single observation. He described the object as "very faint, very small". The position is just 23" from UGC 944, thus the two objects are generally regarded as equivalent. John Louis Emil Dreyer, creator of the New General Catalogue, added the object to the catalogue, adopting Herschel's description.

Description 
The galaxy has an apparent size of 1.6 × 0.4 arcmins and appears very elongated. It has a recessional velocity of approximately 4810 kilometers per second. The distance of NGC 512 from the Solar System can be estimated using Hubble's law, which puts the object at roughly 220 million light-years from the Sun.

See also 
 List of NGC objects (1–1000)

References

External links 

 
 SEDS

Spiral galaxies
Andromeda (constellation)
0512
5132
0944
Astronomical objects discovered in 1827
Discoveries by John Herschel